Battle of Tarafiyah was a major battle of the Saudi–Rashidi War, during the Unification of Saudi Arabia, fought between Rashidi and Saudi rebels in the town of Tarafiyah in Qassim region. The battle took place on 24 September 1907 and resulted in a Saudi victory.

Background
After the execution of Abalkhail's cousin, Emir of Qassim, Abalkhail planned to take revenge from his king, Ibn Saud. Abalkhail re-allied again with the Rashidis, the traditional enemies of Ibn Saud. Abalkhail also made an alliance with Faisal Al-Duwaish, leader of Mutayr clan and the Ikhwan forces, who used to aid Ibn Saud forces in his former battles. Ibn Saud met the allied forces in the battle of Tarafiyah.

References
 Battle of Tarafiyah, Arabic Wikipedia

Tarafiyah 1907
Tarafiyah 1907
1907 in Saudi Arabia